Tails & Trotters is a Portland, Oregon-based pork company which operated a butcher shop until 2022. The company was established in 2007, and began operating from a farmers' market booth in 2009. It has been featured on Diners, Drive-Ins, and Dives and has been recognized by the Good Food Awards.

The butcher shop was located in the northeast Portland part of the Kerns neighborhood. Owners Aaron and Kelly Silverman announced plans to close in 2022 because of rising business costs and challenges caused by the COVID-19 pandemic.

See also 

 COVID-19 pandemic in Portland, Oregon
 Impact of the COVID-19 pandemic on the meat industry in the United States
 Impact of the COVID-19 pandemic on the restaurant industry in the United States
 List of defunct restaurants of the United States

References

External links 

 

2007 establishments in Oregon
American companies established in 2007
Companies based in Portland, Oregon
Defunct restaurants in Portland, Oregon
Kerns, Portland, Oregon
Northeast Portland, Oregon
Restaurants disestablished during the COVID-19 pandemic
Restaurants disestablished in 2022